B S Raja Iyengar (1901 - 1978) was a carnatic vocalist who also served as Court Musician at Mysore Kingdom.

Background and personal life

B.S. Raja Iyengar was born in 1901 in Banavar, Karnataka.

Career

B.S.Raja Iyengar studied the carnatic music with Bidara Krishnappa, K. Vasudeva and K.V.Sreenivasa Iyengar. He was known for his renditions of ragas, padams as well as devotional songs. He also sang many Kannada stage songs.
He was a court Musician at Mysore and received Mysore State Sangeet Nataka Akademy award in 1965. He was awarded Sangeet Natak Akademi Award in 1973 in the field of Music for his contribution to Karnatic Vocal Music. He was also the president of the first Karnataka Ganakala Parishat held in 1970.

References

Musicians from Karnataka
1901 births
People from Karnataka
Year of death missing
Recipients of the Sangeet Natak Akademi Award